Tsang Kam To (born 21 June 1989) is a Hong Kong professional footballer who currently plays for Hong Kong Premier League club Lee Man. He has represented Hong Kong in international competition since childhood. In 2009, he won a gold medal at the East Asian Games as a member of the Hong Kong national under-23 football team.

Known for his versatility, he played as forward when he played for Hong Kong 08. He is adept at different position including wingback and winger. For the Hong Kong under-23 football team, he occasionally plays at centre-back.

Early life
Tsang Kam To was born in Hong Kong, and went to St.Patrick's Catholic Primary School in Wang Tau Hom. He has started playing football in there in his third year. He showed his talent on the school team, and he captained it in his fifth and sixth years in school.

During his last year in primary school he was selected by Hong Kong Football Association to train with the Hong Kong under-14 team. He had his secondary education in POH Chan Kai Memorial College, Sha Tin.

Club career

Early career
Because of his early international career, he was a member of the long-term training section for 2009 East Asian Games. The Football Association signed him for the newly founded Hong Kong First Division League club "Hong Kong 08" with other members of training section for the 2008 Olympic Games because of his good performance in Hong Kong 09. In his early years, he mostly played as a striker. In the league match against Lanwa Redbull on 17 September 2006, the second league match of Tsang Kam To's senior career, he scored his first league goal in the 18th minute. He played 18 matches and had 2 goals in 2006–07 season.

After 2008 Summer Olympics qualification, Hong Kong 08 had been dissolved. Another new first division team Workable contracted former Olympics team members including Tsang Kam To. In Workable, for his high-speed, coach Lee Kin Wo has changed his position from striker to wingback. He was the regular player of the team and he played 21 matches in 2007–08 season.

Kitchee

Tsang Kam To's performance impressed the football world of Hong Kong and he agreed a deal to sign for Kitchee in the summer of 2008. He scored his first goal for Kitchee in his first appearance of the team in a league match against Xiangxue Eisiti on 28 February 2009. He was mainly used as a substitute in the 2008–09 season since captain Leung Chi Wing, Canadian Landon Ling and Cameroonian Hugues Nanmi occupied the wingback positions of two sides. In the following season, all three wingbacks left the club but Josep Gombau, the new coach, selected centre-back Li Hang Wui for the position, leaving Tsang Kam To as a substitute for most matches.

In the summer in 2010, Kitchee planned to loan Tsang Kam To to Tai Chung, giving him more chances to play football. However, Tsang Kam To performed wonderfully in pre-season friendly matches and manager Ken Ng cancelled the plan. During the 2010–11 season, Tsang Kam To still mostly acted as a substitute of his teammates but he was also used in the 2011 Canon Cup match against Villarreal.

Because Kitchee had won the 2010–11 Hong Kong First Division League, Tsang Kam To had had a chance to participate in the 2011 Barclays Asia Trophy. He started in both the semi-final match against Chelsea and third place play-off against Blackburn Rovers. In the third place play-off, Tsang Kam To was fouled by Martin Olsson in the penalty box and a penalty kick was awarded, though Ubay Luzardo missed the penalty. Kitchee got the wooden spoon.

On 23 October 2011, Tsang Kam To came off the substitutes bench as a winger in the 73rd minute to assist a crucial equaliser against TSW Pegasus in the 83rd minute and score inside the penalty area in the 86th minute, defeating TSW Pegasus by 3–2. Tsang Kam To claim his sense of striker still strongly exist and he want to prove that Hong Kong footballers can feel up to be a shooter in the team. Tsang Kam To always have training for shoot frequently to convince Josep Gombau to select him as a forward.

Tsang Kam To had more opportunities to play in the field later. He played the Hong Kong derby winning by two goals with Kitchee in 2011–12 Hong Kong FA Cup. He also played four 2012 AFC Cup group stage matches against Terengganu, Sông Lam Nghệ An and Tampines Rovers and Kitchee finally won the first place in the stage. In the final fixture of the league, Kitchee beat Biu Chun Rangers by 4–1 and Tsang Kam To scored in the 11th minute.

Although Kitchee won the 2011–12 Hong Kong League Cup and 2011–12 Hong Kong First Division League, the team was eliminated by Arema in 2012 AFC Cup round of 16. In the round of 16 game, Tsang Kam To came off the bench at half-time but he did not make any score and assist.

In 2012–13 season, Tsang Kam To still was a substitute player of Kitchee in local competitions. Pleasantly, he scored in the league game against Southern District on 13 September 2012. Kitchee won the FA Cup, first edition Season Play-off and First Division League again this season. By the way, Tsang Kam To played most of Kitchee's 2013 AFC Cup matches, against Semen Padang, Churchill Brothers and Warriors in group stage and Kelantan and Al-Faisaly in knockout stage. In the AFC Cup home match against Warriors, Tsang Kam To scored the fourth goal and Kitchee won by five.

Eastern
Tsang joined Eastern in 2015 and left 5 years later on 1 June 2020 after the expiration of his contract.

Lee Man
On 2 June 2020, Lee Man announced the signing of Tsang.

International career
Tsang Kam To has earned caps with all of Hong Kong's youth and senior teams for which he was eligible. Hong Kong Football Association have decided to play Tsang Kam To in an age group above his age, so he was selected by the Hong Kong national under-14 football team in his last primary school year. The association had planned him as a player of 2009 East Asian Games team originally and he was contracted to Hong Kong 08 later, formed for training youngsters for 2008 AFC Pre-Olympic Tournament.

Tsang Kam To did not play in any matches of 2008 Pre-Olympic Tournament in 2007; the coach preferred strikers with greater strength. He left summer training section of 2009 East Asian Games team in Croatia for personal reasons, and therefore Philip Lee, general director of EAG team, criticised five absentees so conceited.

One year later, Goran Paulić took up the head coach of EAG team, and he recalled Tsang Kam To because South China and TSW Pegasus boycotted Paulić. Tsang Kam To earned his first cap of under-23 football team as a defender in 2009 Hong Kong–Macau Interport on 20 June 2009, and he was age of 19.

Tsang Kam To was selected for 2009 East Asian Games, but he did not play group stage matches and semifinal match, for Lau Nim Yat was the first choice of right wingback. Due to injury of Lau Lim Yat, Tsang Kam To was able to play final of the tournament against Japan on 12 December 2009 as first start right back and Hong Kong defeated Japan at penalty shootout finally.

In 2010 Asian Games, Tsang Kam To was the regular start-up player of Hong Kong team and he played all four games of the team. Although Hong Kong knocked out in the quarter-final, head coach Tsang Wai Chung paid tribute to Tsang Kam To for his bravery. In February 2011, Tsang Kam To was selected for the senior team by Tsang Wai Chung for a friendly against Malaysia in Kuala Lumpur. He earned his first senior cap but Hong Kong lost by two goals.

After two major under-23 events, Tsang Kam To became a leader of 2012 Pre-Olympic team. Because of a shortage of centre backs, Tsang Kam To was selected at centre-back in the Pre-Olympic team. He played both the first round against Maldives and the second against Uzbekistan at the 2012 AFC Pre-Olympic Tournament and Hong Kong were eliminated in a 3–0 defeat to Uzbekistan.

Honours

Club
Kitchee
 Hong Kong Premier League: 2014–15
 Hong Kong First Division League: 2010–11, 2011–12, 2013–14
 Hong Kong FA Cup: 2011–12, 2012–13, 2014–15
 Hong Kong League Cup: 2011–12, 2014–15
 Hong Kong Season Play-offs: 2012–13

Eastern
 Hong Kong Premier League: 2015–16
 Hong Kong Senior Shield: 2015–16

International
Hong Kong U-23
 East Asian Games: 2009
 Hong Kong–Macau Interport: 2009
 Hong Kong Sports Stars Award for Team Only Sport: 2009

Career statistics

Club
As of 27 September 2015

International

Hong Kong U-23
As of 20 August 2011

Hong Kong
As of 20 August 2011

References

External links
 
 Tsang Kam To at HKFA
 

1989 births
Living people
Hong Kong footballers
Association football forwards
Association football defenders
Hong Kong First Division League players
Hong Kong Premier League players
Hong Kong international footballers
Shek Kip Mei SA players
Kitchee SC players
Eastern Sports Club footballers
Lee Man FC players
Footballers at the 2010 Asian Games
Asian Games competitors for Hong Kong